The greenish naked-backed fruit bat (Dobsonia viridis) is a species of megabat in the family Pteropodidae. It is endemic to some of the northeastern Lesser Sunda Islands in Indonesia, being found on the Kai Islands, the Banda Islands, and the central and southern Molucca Islands, including Seram Island, Ambon Island, and Buru Island.

See also

References

Dobsonia
Bats of Indonesia
Endemic fauna of Indonesia
Fauna of the Lesser Sunda Islands
Fauna of the Maluku Islands
Fauna of Buru
Fauna of the Kai Islands
Fauna of Seram Island
Banda Islands
Bat, Greenish naked-backed fruit
Taxonomy articles created by Polbot
Mammals described in 1896
Taxa named by Pierre Marie Heude